Lingareddypalem is a village in Krishna District of Andhra Pradesh, India. It is located at a distance of 110 km from Vijayawada and 50 km from Machilipatnam.

Famous for Lord Shiva Temple 
Famous for Lord Shiva incarnation as Sri Gokarneshwara Swami with Mother Parvathi as Sri Bala Tripura Sundari Devi.

Education 
There are two schools in Lingareddypalem. One is Zilla parishad high school and the second one is Elementary school.
Villages in Krishna district